The 1912 VPI Gobblers football team represented Virginia Agricultural and Mechanical College and Polytechnic Institute in the 1912 college football season. The team was led by their head coach Branch Bocock and finished with a record of five wins and four losses (5–4).

Schedule

Players
The following players were members of the 1912 football team according to the roster published in the 1913 edition of The Bugle, the Virginia Tech yearbook.

References

VPI
Virginia Tech Hokies football seasons
VPI Gobblers football